Olivencia is a Spanish surname. Notable people with the surname include:

Francisco Olivencia (1934–2019), Spanish lawyer and politician
Jamin Olivencia (born 1985), American professional wrestler
Janice Olivencia (born 1982), Puerto Rican golfer
Manuel Olivencia (1929–2018), Spanish lawyer
Tommy Olivencia (1938–2006), Puerto Rican musician

Spanish-language surnames